Olga Viktorovna Nikolaeva ((born 14 May 1972 in Novosibirsk) is a Russian volleyball player. She was a member of the national team that won the silver medal at the 2004 Summer Olympics in Athens. She currently plays for Dynamo Moscow.

References
 sports-reference

1972 births
Living people
Sportspeople from Novosibirsk
Russian women's volleyball players
Olympic volleyball players of Russia
Volleyball players at the 2004 Summer Olympics
Olympic silver medalists for Russia
Olympic medalists in volleyball
Medalists at the 2004 Summer Olympics